James Edward Grelle (September 30, 1936 – June 13, 2020) was an American middle-distance runner. He had his best achievements in the 1500 m event, finishing eighth at the 1960 Olympics, winning a gold and a silver medal at the Pan American Games in 1963 and 1959, respectively.

Grelle's first success was winning back to back Oregon state titles in the 880 yard run in 1954 and 1955 for Lincoln High School in Portland.

While running for the University of Oregon he won the NCAA Men's Outdoor Track and Field Championship in 1959 after being a runner up the previous two years.  Leading up to the 1960 Olympics, he won the USA Outdoor Track and Field Championships.  He also added two Indoor Championships in 1965 and 1966.

In 1962 at the Mt. SAC Relays Grelle became the 4th American sub-4 minute miler.  He won the Mile there three years in a row.  In 1965 he briefly held the American record in the mile at 3:55.4.  Nine days later, Jim Ryun improved upon the record.  Ryun also relegated Grelle to a non-qualifying fourth place in the 1964 Olympic Trials.  Previously in 1963 he held the American record in the 2 mile run at 8:25.2.

Grelle was inducted into the Oregon Sports Hall of Fame in 1981, to the Mt. SAC Relays Hall of Fame in 1991, and to the Oregon Ducks Hall of Fame in 1994.

Grelle died on June 13, 2020 at the age of 83.

References

External links

1936 births
2020 deaths
American male middle-distance runners
Olympic track and field athletes of the United States
Oregon Ducks men's track and field athletes
Lincoln High School (Portland, Oregon) alumni
Athletes (track and field) at the 1960 Summer Olympics
Athletes (track and field) at the 1959 Pan American Games
Athletes (track and field) at the 1963 Pan American Games
Track and field athletes from Portland, Oregon
American masters athletes
University of Oregon alumni
Pan American Games gold medalists for the United States
Pan American Games silver medalists for the United States
Pan American Games medalists in athletics (track and field)
Medalists at the 1959 Pan American Games
Medalists at the 1963 Pan American Games